Uvelsky (masculine), Uvelskaya (feminine), or Uvelskoye (neuter) may refer to:
Uvelsky District, a district of Chelyabinsk Oblast, Russia
Uvelsky (rural locality), a rural locality (a settlement) in Chelyabinsk Oblast, Russia
Uvelsky (air base), an air base in Russia